Modern Love is the seventh studio album by American singer-songwriter Matt Nathanson. It was released on June 21, 2011. Modern Love was Nathanson's second album for Vanguard Records, following his 2007 album Some Mad Hope. He released the first single, "Faster", as a free download to his fan mailing list in March 2011. Modern Love debuted at number 17 on the Billboard 200 for the week of July 9, 2011.

Critical reception

Modern Love received positive reviews from music critics. On Metacritic, which assigns a normalized rating out of 100 to reviews from mainstream critics, the album received an average score of 72, based on 4 reviews.

Jedd Beaudoin of PopMatters called it "the closest a pop album comes to perfection this year", giving high praise to the track listing for being an amalgam of late 80s to early 90s pop music and balancing both its ballads and upbeat tracks, concluding that it will have "a long and positive legacy, one that can be appreciated by a broad audience if only that audience can listen without prejudice." AllMusic editor Andrew Leahey commended Nathanson for making a consistent project that puts a polished sheen into his signature musicianship from the previous record but found it overall to be "almost meticulously inoffensive," concluding that its "both the blessing and the curse of this album, which charts a steady path but offers few surprises as a result."

Track listing

Personnel 
Musicians
 Matt Nathanson - Lead & Background Vocals, Acoustic & Electric Guitar
 Zac Rae - Drum Programming, Keyboards, Baritone Ukulele, Glockenspiel, Guitar, Drums, Percussion
 Ben West - Piano, Keyboards
 Rainman - Drum Programming, Piano, Keyboards, Synths
 Brandon Bush - Piano, Keyboards, Wurlitzer
 Aaron Tap - Acoustic & Electric Guitar, Background Vocals
 Michael Chaves - Acoustic & Electric Guitar, Nylon String Guitar
 David Levita - Acoustic & Electric Guitar, Lap Steel Guitar
 John Thomasson - Bass Guitar, Upright Bass
 Curt Schnieder, Tim Smith - Bass Guitar
 Jason McGerr, Aaron Sterling, Shannon Forrest - Drums, Percussion

Horn Section
 Danny T. Levin - Trumpet, Flugelhorn, Alto Horn, Trombone, Euphonium
 David Moyer - Tenor & Baritone Sax, Bass Clarinet, Bassoon
 Chris Miller - Tuba

Group Vocals
 Zac Rae, Michael Chaves, Mark Weinberg, Matt Nathanson - The "Mercy" Clap Choir
 Ayappa Biddanda, Isaac Johnson, Paul Doucette, Aaron Tap, Matt Nathanson - The "Modern Love" Choir

"Run" Featured Artists
 Jennifer Nettles - Lead & Background Vocals
 Kristian Bush - Acoustic & Electric Guitar, Background Vocals

Charts

Weekly charts

Year-end charts

References

External links 
 mattnathanson.com/modernlove
 

2011 albums
Matt Nathanson albums
Vanguard Records albums